The Parochial Union of Independents Group (GUPI) was a local progressive political party in Ordino, Andorra.

History
In the local elections in 2003 GUPI won two of the ten seats in Ordino. For the 2005 parliamentary elections the party was part of an alliance with the Social Democratic Party and Democratic Renewal named L'Alternativa. The alliance won twelve seats.

GUPI retained its alliance with the Social Democratic Party for the 2009 elections, with the coalition emerging victorious after winning 14 of the 28 seats.

References

Political parties in Andorra
Political parties established in 2003
Political parties disestablished in 2013